Iñaki Villanueva Martín (born 10 February 1991) is a Spanish rugby sevens player. He was part of the squad that won the 2016 Men's Rugby Sevens Final Olympic Qualification Tournament in Monaco and he played the Olympic tournament.

His brother is Alejandro Villanueva, a former American football offensive tackle in the National Football League (NFL).

References

External links 
 

1991 births
Living people
Sportspeople from the Province of Cádiz
Rugby sevens players at the 2016 Summer Olympics
Olympic rugby sevens players of Spain
Spain international rugby sevens players
Spanish people of Basque descent
Spanish rugby union players
People from El Puerto de Santa María